Ambrustanya is a former village, now a part of Seregélyes, Hungary. The postal code is 8111.

Geography 
Ambrustanya's altitude is 122 meters.

It currently has a population of around 0 (in 2001).

It lies approximately 2 km northwest of Seregélyes.

References 

Populated places in Fejér County